Risdonius is a genus of Australian araneomorph spiders in the family Anapidae, first described by V. V. Hickman in 1939. it contains only three species.

References

Anapidae
Araneomorphae genera
Spiders of Australia